Górna Wola may refer to the following places in Poland:
Górna Wola, Łódź Voivodeship (central Poland)
Górna Wola, Masovian Voivodeship (east-central Poland)